Chinga su Corazon is the debut studio album by the noise rock band Gravitar. It was released in 1994 on Charnel Music.

Track listing

Personnel 
Adapted from the Chinga su Corazon liner notes.

Gravitar
 Eric Cook – drums, percussion
 Harold Richardson – electric guitar
 Geoff Walker – clarinet, vocals

Production and additional personnel
 John D'Agostini – production, engineering
 Gravitar – production

Release history

References

External links 
 Chinga su Corazon at Discogs (list of releases)

1994 debut albums
Charnel Music albums
Gravitar (band) albums